Anna High School may refer to:

In the United States 
Anna High School (Ohio), Anna, Ohio
Anna High School (Texas), Anna, Texas

See also 
Anna-Jonesboro Community High School, Anna, Illinois, United States